The Rural Municipality of Golden West No. 95 is a rural municipality (RM) in the Canadian province of Saskatchewan within Census Division No. 1 and  Division No. 1. It is located in the southeast portion of the province.

History 
The RM of Golden West No. 95 incorporated as a rural municipality on December 13, 1909.

Government

Communities and localities 
The following unincorporated communities are within the RM.

Organized hamlets
 Corning

Localities
 Gapview
 Handsworth

The Ocean Man First Nation is also adjacent to the RM

Demographics 

Economy 
The RM's major industry is agriculture.

Government 
The RM of Golden West No. 95 is governed by an elected municipal council and an appointed administrator that meets on the second Thursday of every month. The reeve of the RM is Kurt Corscadden while its administrator is Edward Mish. The RM's office is located in Corning.

Transportation 
 Saskatchewan Highway 47
 Saskatchewan Highway 616
 Saskatchewan Highway 701
 Saskatchewan Highway 711
 Canadian Pacific Railway (abandoned)

References 

G
Division No. 1, Saskatchewan